Synbiotics refer to food ingredients or dietary supplements combining probiotics and prebiotics in a form of synergism, hence synbiotics. The synbiotic concept was first introduced as "mixtures of probiotics and prebiotics that beneficially affect the host by improving the survival and implantation of live microbial dietary supplements in the gastrointestinal tract, by selectively stimulating the growth and/or by activating the metabolism of one or a limited number of health-promoting bacteria, thus improving host welfare". As of 2018, the research on this concept is preliminary, with no high-quality evidence from clinical research that such benefits exist.

Synbiotics may be complementary synbiotics, where each component is independently chosen for its potential effect on host health, or synergistic synbiotics, where the prebiotic component is chosen to support the activity of the chosen probiotic. Research is evaluating if synbiotics can be optimized, (known as 'optibiotics') which are purported to enhance the growth and health benefits of existing probiotics.

Probiotics are live bacteria which are intended to colonize the large intestine, although as of 2018, there is no evidence that adding dietary bacteria to healthy people has any added effect. A prebiotic is a food or dietary supplement product that may induce the growth or activity of beneficial microorganisms. A prebiotic may be a fiber, but a fiber is not necessarily a prebiotic.

Using prebiotics and probiotics in combination may be described as synbiotic, but the United Nations Food & Agriculture Organization  recommends that the term "synbiotic" be used only if the net health benefit is synergistic. Synbiotic formulations in combination with pasteurized breast milk are under preliminary clinical research for their potential to ameliorate necrotizing enterocolitis in infants, although there was insufficient evidence to warrant recommending synbiotics for this use as of 2016.

Examples
 Bifidobacteria and Fructooligosaccharides (FOS)
 Bifidobacteria or lactobacilli with FOS or inulins or galactooligosaccharides (GOS)
 Lactobacillus rhamnosus GG and inulins
 Polyphenol

References

 
 
 
 
 
 

Prebiotics (nutrition)
Probiotics
Bacteriology
Digestive system